Leutnant Heinrich Henkel (born 11 May 1896, date of death unknown) was a World War I flying ace credited with eight aerial victories.

Biography

Heinrich Henkel was born in Hamburg, the German Empire on 11 May 1896.

On 1 September 1914, Henkel volunteered for military service in Reserve Fusilier Artillery Regiment Nr. 3. He went into battle with them at Nancy, France, at Antwerp, and at Ypres. On 1 July 1915, he was transferred to the infantry. He was wounded in action on 25 September 1916. He was subsequently promoted to the officer's ranks as a Leutnant in December 1916. He volunteered for aviation duty and began training at Fliegerersatz-Abteilung (Replacement Detachment) 1 in February 1917.

Henkel would also undergo fighter pilot's training at Valenciennes, France before joining Jagdstaffel 37 in May 1918. He scored his first aerial victory on 9 July, and had scored seven more by 31 October 1918. Three of his eight victories were shot-down observation balloons, making him a "balloon buster". Heinrich Henkel survived the war, having won the Iron Cross for his gallantry, but faded into obscurity.

Sources of information

References
 Franks, Norman; Bailey, Frank W.; Guest, Russell. Above the Lines: The Aces and Fighter Units of the German Air Service, Naval Air Service and Flanders Marine Corps, 1914–1918. Grub Street, 1993. , .

1896 births
German World War I flying aces
Year of death missing
Military personnel from Hamburg
Recipients of the Iron Cross (1914)